Lee In-chang (born 24 March 1956) is a South Korean wrestler. He competed in the men's Greco-Roman 48 kg at the 1976 Summer Olympics.

References

External links
 

1956 births
Living people
South Korean male sport wrestlers
Olympic wrestlers of South Korea
Wrestlers at the 1976 Summer Olympics
Place of birth missing (living people)
20th-century South Korean people